Jana Roxas (born August 22, 1990) is a Filipina former actress. 

She was known as Starstruck Batch 3 Avenger along with Chuck Allie, Iwa Moto, Gian Carlos and the Ultimate Survivors Jackie Rice and Marky Cielo. She appeared in GMA-7 TV series like Dapat Ka Bang Mahalin? with Aljur Abrenica and Kris Bernal, and Ikaw Sana with Jennylyn Mercado and Mark Herras.

After she played the kind-hearted rape victim in Dapat Ka Bang Mahalin?, Jana Roxas reappeared as the vindictive and socialite Charlene in Ikaw Sana.

Personal life
Roxas was born in Tarlac. Her parents were separated shortly after she was born. She was abandoned by her father at birth, while her mother left and remarried. She was raised by her own grandmother.

Since 2016, she is in a relationship with fellow Pinoy Big Brother: Teen Edition Plus big winner and Kapamilya actor Ejay Falcon.

Filmography
Ikaw Sana (TV series) (2009)
Adik Sa'Yo (TV series) (2009)
Dapat Ka Bang Mahalin? (TV series) (2009)
Gaano Kadalas ang Minsan (TV series) (2008)
Codename: Asero (TV series) (2008)
Magkaibigan (2008)
Lipgloss (TV series) (2008)
E.S.P. (TV series) (2008)
Zaido: Pulis Pangkalawakan (TV series) (2007)
My Only Love (TV series) (2007)
Mga Kwento ni Lola Basyang - Ang Mahiwagang Balabal (2007)
Now and Forever - Duyan (2006)
Love to Love - Young At Heart (2006)
SOP Gigsters (TV variety show) (2005–2006)
StarStruck: The Nationwide Invasion (TV reality show) (2005–2006)

References

External links

1990 births
Living people
Actresses from Tarlac
GMA Network personalities
StarStruck (Philippine TV series) participants
Participants in Philippine reality television series